The Drenica massacres were a series of killings of Kosovo Albanian civilians committed by Serbian special police forces in the Drenica region of central Kosovo.

According to Human Rights Watch, abuses in the Drenica region during the Kosovo War 1998–1999 "were so widespread that a comprehensive description is beyond the scope of this report". Key atrocities took place in the period of February – March 1998 in the Ćirez (Qirez), Likošane, and Prekaz and during the NATO bombing of Yugoslavia, from March to June 1999 in the villages of Izbica, Rezala , Poklek and Staro Čikatovo.

Background 
Drenica is a hilly region in central Kosovo inhabited almost exclusively by ethnic Albanians. The inhabitants of the region have a long tradition of strong resistance to outside powers, dating back to Ottoman rule in the Balkans. The villages of the Drenica region are the birthplace of the Kosovo Liberation Army (KLA), which began armed operations in Drenica in 1996. By 1997, Kosovo Albanians had begun to refer to Drenica as "liberated territory" because of the KLA's presence.

Massacres in 1998 

In January 1998, Serbian special police began operations that raided villages in Drenica linked to the KLA. Between February 28 and March 5, police launched multiple military-style attacks on the villages of Ćirez, Likoshan and Prekaz, using armored vehicles and helicopters. Although the KLA engaged in combat during these attacks, government forces fired at women, children, and other noncombatants.

On February 28 and March 1, responding to KLA ambushes of the police, special forces attacked two adjacent villages, Ćirez and Likoshan. These forces included helicopters, armored vehicles, mortars and machine guns which were turned without warning on civilians in the two villages.  In all there were 24 civilians killed in the Ćirez and Likošane massacres. Less than one week later, on 5 March special police attacked the nearby village of Prekaz - home of Adem Jashari, the leader of the KLA. Jashari was killed along with his entire family, including women and children. The attacks, and the fighting that ensued, left 83 villagers dead, including at least 24 women and children.

In all 83 Kosovo Albanians were killed.  Among the dead were elderly people and at least 24 women and children.  Many of the victims were shot at close range which suggested summary executions; subsequent reports from eyewitnesses confirmed this.

On 3 March 1998, some 50,000 people gathered for the burial of 24 Drenica massacre victims in the village of Likoshan.  These massacres were partly responsible for the radicalisation of the Kosovo Albanian population and helped to solidify armed opposition to Belgrade's rule. Many ethnic Albanians who had been committed to the nonviolent politics of Ibrahim Rugova decided to join the KLA, in part because they viewed armed insurgency as the only means of achieving independence.

The massacres marked the beginning of the Kosovo War. After 28 February 1998, the fighting become an armed conflict. Once armed conflict broke out, the International Criminal Tribunal for the Former Yugoslavia (ICTY) became involved. On March 10 the ICTY proclaimed that its "jurisdiction covers the recent violence in Kosovo".

Massacres in 1999 

Between 19 March and 15 June 1999, government forces in Drenica engaged in a campaign of ethnic cleansing of the Albanians of Kosovo that involved summary and arbitrary executions, detentions, beatings, looting, and destruction of schools, hospitals, and other civilian objects."

Glogovac (Gllogovc), a municipality that was a stronghold of the KLA in Drenica, was hard hit by this campaign. In Stari Poklek, a village close to Glogovac, Yugoslav forces executed two men and the family of one of the men due to their KLA links. Out of 47 family members (including 23 children under fifteen years old) that the forces attempted to kill with a grenade thrown into a room, there were six survivors. In Vrbovac, it is believed that 150 people were executed. Albanians, KLA members, suspected KLA members and their families in other villages surrounding Glogovac were also subject to execution by Serb forces. In Glogovac, over five days in May, the majority of the population was expelled and sent toward the Macedonian border.

In Čikatovo, more than 100 ethnic Albanians were executed and buried in a mass grave according to war crimes investigators.

On 15 June 1999, Yugoslav forces withdrew from Glogovac following an agreement signed by NATO.

Mass graves
In May 2010, a mass grave containing 250 bodies from the massacres were found in the village of Rudnica in Serbia. The bodies were transferred from graves located in Drenica in May or early June 1999.

See also 
 List of massacres in Yugoslavia
 Attack on Prekaz
 War crimes in the Kosovo War
 Death of the Bytyqi brothers

References

External links 
 Under Orders: War Crimes in Kosovo (Human Right Watch)
 A Week of Terror in Drenica: Humanitarian Law Violations in Kosovo (Human Right Watch)

Serbian war crimes in the Kosovo War
Law enforcement in Serbia
Massacres in the Kosovo War
1998 in Kosovo
1999 in Kosovo
Massacres in 1998
Massacres in 1999
Anti-Albanian sentiment